Yukarı, also spelled Yuxarı, means "upper" in Turkic languages. It may refer to:

Places

Azerbaijan

Turkey

Other
 Aşağı, "lower"